The Municipality of Šmarje pri Jelšah is a municipality in the traditional region of Styria in northeastern Slovenia. The seat of the municipality is the town of Šmarje pri Jelšah. Šmarje pri Jelšah became a municipality in 1994.

Settlements

In addition to the municipal seat of Šmarje pri Jelšah, the municipality also includes the following settlements:

 Babna Brda
 Babna Gora
 Babna Reka
 Beli Potok pri Lembergu
 Belo
 Bezgovica
 Bobovo pri Šmarju
 Bodrež
 Bodrišna Vas
 Brecljevo
 Brezje pri Lekmarju
 Bukovje v Babni Gori
 Cerovec pri Šmarju
 Dol pri Pristavi
 Dol pri Šmarju
 Dragomilo
 Dvor
 Gaj
 Globoko pri Šmarju
 Gornja Vas
 Grliče
 Grobelce
 Grobelno (Šmarje portion)*
 Hajnsko
 Jazbina
 Jerovska Vas
 Ješovec pri Šmarju
 Kamenik
 Konuško
 Koretno
 Korpule
 Kristan Vrh
 Krtince
 Laše
 Lekmarje
 Lemberg pri Šmarju
 Lipovec
 Mala Pristava
 Mestinje
 Močle
 Nova Vas pri Šmarju
 Orehovec
 Pečica
 Pijovci
 Platinovec
 Polžanska Gorca
 Polžanska Vas
 Predel
 Predenca
 Preloge pri Šmarju
 Pustike
 Rakovec
 Senovica
 Šentvid pri Grobelnem
 Šerovo
 Škofija
 Sladka Gora
 Sotensko pri Šmarju
 Spodnja Ponkvica
 Spodnje Mestinje
 Spodnje Selce
 Spodnje Tinsko
 Stranje
 Strtenica
 Sveti Štefan
 Topolovec
 Vinski Vrh pri Šmarju
 Vodenovo
 Vrh
 Vršna Vas
 Zadrže
 Zastranje
 Završe pri Grobelnem
 Zgornje Tinsko
 Zibika
 Zibiška Vas

*Because the settlement of Grobelno straddles two municipalities, it appears on this list as well as the Municipality of Šentjur list

References

External links

Municipality of Šmarje pri Jelšah on Geopedia
Municipality of Šmarje pri Jelšah website

Šmarje pri Jelšah
1994 establishments in Slovenia